Diisopropylnaphthalenes (DIPN) is a solvent for carbonless copy paper.  The oil consists of a mixture of isomers of diisopropylnaphthalene.  Some key properties are broad liquid range, low volatility, and low toxicity. DIN is also known as Kureha Micro Capsule Oil (KMC oil).

One component of DIPN is 2,6-diisopropylnaphthalene, which has more specialized applications.

References

Naphthalenes
Aromatic hydrocarbons